Galina Petrovna Khovanskaya (born August 23, 1943, Moscow, RSFSR, USSR) is a Russian politician, deputy of the State Duma (since the 2003 legislative election).

In 1996 she graduated from the Academic Law University at the Institute of State and Law of RAS.

Family 
Galina Khovanskaya's parents were teachers at MSU. Her father died in the Great Patriotic War in 1945.  Her husband is physicist and she has a daughter and two grandchildren.

Awards and honours
 Medal Defender of a Free Russia (1993)
 Person of the Year 2013
 Order of Honour (2014)

References

External links
 Official site
 О поправках Хованской 
 Профиль на сайте партии

1943 births
Living people
Recipients of the Order of Honour (Russia)
21st-century Russian women politicians
A Just Russia politicians
21st-century Russian politicians
Moscow Engineering Physics Institute alumni
Deputies of Moscow City Duma
Fourth convocation members of the State Duma (Russian Federation)
Fifth convocation members of the State Duma (Russian Federation)
Sixth convocation members of the State Duma (Russian Federation)
Seventh convocation members of the State Duma (Russian Federation)
Eighth convocation members of the State Duma (Russian Federation)